Kapil Sharma (born Kapil Punj; 2 April 1981) is an Indian actor, stand-up comedian and television host from Punjab, India, Primarily known for hosting The Kapil Sharma Show. Referred to in the media as the "King Of Comedy" and "Comedy King". He won the stand-up comedy reality show, The Great Indian Laughter Challenge season 3 in 2007. He previously hosted and produced television comedy shows such as Comedy Nights with Kapil, Family Time with Kapil on Colors TV and Sony TV channels respectively.

He has won multiple seasons of the comedy reality show Comedy Circus on Sony TV along with various partners and in 2011 participated in the singing reality show Star Ya Rockstar of Zee TV, where he finished as a second runner-up.

He worked in some films such as Bhavnao Ko Samjho (2010), Kis Kisko Pyaar Karoon (2015), and Firangi (2017) and did short appearances in ABCD 2 (2015). He did Hindi dubbing for The Angry Birds Movie 2 (2019). Kapil Sharma also does live stand-up comedy-stage shows.

Early and personal life
Sharma was born in a Punjabi family in the city of Amritsar of Punjab, India as Kapil Punj. His father Jeetendra Kumar Punj was a head constable in Punjab Police, while his mother Janak Rani is a homemaker. His father was diagnosed with cancer in 1997 and died in 2004 at AIIMS in Delhi. He studied at Shri Ram Ashram Senior Secondary School, in Amristar and Hindu College in Amritsar. He is featured in the list of prominent alumni of Apeejay College of Fine Arts, Jalandhar. Sharma has a brother named Ashok Kumar Sharma, who is a Police constable and a sister named Pooja Pawan Devgan.

Sharma was in a relationship with Preeti Simoes for eight years. Simoes also worked as his manager, their affair started with Comedy Nights with Kapil and was both together until 2017.

He married Ginni Chatrath in Jalandhar on 12 December 2018. They have two children – a daughter and a son.

Career
He had previously worked in the Punjabi show Hasde Hasaande Ravo on MH One channel. Sharma has stated that he moved to Mumbai to become a singer.

He participated in Sony's Comedy Circus and went on to win six seasons of the show. He also hosted the dance reality show Jhalak Dikhhla Jaa Season 6 and another comedy show Chhote Miyan. Sharma was seen as a contestant in the show Ustaadon Ka Ustaad in 2008. In 2011, he participated as a contestant in Zee TV's singing reality show Star Ya Rockstar, he fished as runner up. In 2013, Kapil launched his own show, Comedy Nights with Kapil, under his banner K9 Productions on Colors TV.

At the CNN-IBN Indian of the Year awards 2013, Sharma was felicitated with the Indian of the Year award in the entertainment category by veteran actor Amol Palekar. In the same year he did live stage shows in Oman.  During the 2014 Lok Sabha Elections, he was appointed the Brand Ambassador by the Delhi Election Commission.

Sharma was the co-host of the 60th Filmfare Awards in 2015 along with Karan Johar. He was the presenter for the fourth season of Celebrity Cricket League, 2014. He appeared as a guest on the opening episode of the eighth season of the Indian television game show Kaun Banega Crorepati and also as a celebrity guest on The Anupam Kher Show. He also appeared as a guest in Koffee With Karan in 2017.

Sharma made his Bollywood debut as the male lead in the movie Kis Kisko Pyaar Karoon, a romantic-comedy directed by Abbas Mustan opposite four actresses, Elli Avram, Manjari Phadnis, Simran Kaur Mundi and Sai Lokur. The film was released on 25 September 2015 to mixed reviews from critics but did record-breaking opening day business for a debut. In the same year he signed and paid to do six live shows in North America but the event organizer Amit Jaitly alleged that Sharma not did show up in one city and thus filed a court case for breach of contract against Sharma in New York's court. Jaitly also accused Sharma is not taking his phone calls, the case is pending in New York's court.

His show Comedy Nights with Kapil on Colors aired its last episode on 24 January 2016. Sharma then began a new show titled The Kapil Sharma Show on Sony Entertainment Television under his K9 Productions. The Kapil Sharma Show debuted on 23 April 2016 to a positive response from the viewers.

In 2017, he did not record his TV show multiple times and cancelled shootings, due to several actors like Ajay Devgn, Shah Rukh Khan and their crew having to return from the sets when Kapil Sharma did not show up. Later Kapil Sharma was admitted into an Ayurvedic ashram in Karnataka to leave his Alcohol addiction but he left the ashram before attending the full treatment of 40 days, in 12 days. He told DNA (newspaper) in an interview that he had suffered from high blood pressure and other health issues. Before this Sharma assaulted his employee and fellow comedian on his show, Sunil Grover after drinking alcohol and abusing other fellow comedians. After this Grover quit Sharma's TV show.

His second movie Firangi was released on 1 December 2017. Directed by Rajiev Dhingra and produced by Sharma himself, Firangi was a period drama film set in the year 1920. Sharma played the role of Manga. Renuka Vyavahare of The Times of India in a review wrote, 'Firangi is a boring film', gave 2.0/5 stars and other critics, panned it for a bad story, and slow speed. It emerged as a big flop at the box-office. The 25 crore film managed to earn 10 crores and Sharma suffered losses.

His next show was launched on 25 March 2018 stating as Family Time With Kapil Sharma which ended on 1 April after only 3 episodes. In 2018, he produced a Punjabi movie named Son of Manjeet Singh which was released on 12 October 2018. His show The Kapil Sharma Show was renewed with a new season which started airing on 29 December 2018, produced by Salman Khan.

In 2020, it was announced he will star in a kids comedy show, titled The Honey Bunny Show With Kapil Sharma on Sony Yay. In January 2020, Kapil Sharma - Krushna Abhishek and other members of his Sony TV show did live show in Dubai of United Arab Emirates.

In January 2022, it was announced that a biopic on his life is under development. Titled Funkaar the film will be directed by Mrighdeep Singh Lamba.

The Kapil Sharma Show initiated airing on Sony on September 10, 2022. The show's one of the main actor Krushna Abhishek left the show after monetary differences. Before the start of shoot in June–July, Sharma did live shows in North America.

Controversies 
In 2016, Sharma tagged Indian prime minister Narendra Modi in a tweet and alleged that Brihanmumbai Municipal Corporation (BMC) took 5 Lakh rupees bribe from him for construction of his office. “I am paying 15 crores income tax from last five years and still I have to pay 5 lacs to bribe to BMC office for making my office Narendra Modi, Yeh hain aapke achhe din?", he tweeted.  In response chief of BMC's vigilance department asked him the names of the people who took bribes and assured him to take stringent action against them. But later revealed that Sharma himself was doing illegal activities. BMC issued a stop work notice to him and asked him to stop illegal extensions work in his two bungalows, ground in Andheri and told him to demolish illegal work in the next 24 hours. On 4 August 2016, BMC demolished parts of the extensions and their officials alleged that Kapil Sharma did internal changes in his properties and office without legal permission from BMC.

In 2018, Sharma did a show for Pakistan Super League in Dubai, United Arab Emirates, angering Indian fans. Maharashtrian party Shiv Sena slammed Sharma and said, "Kapil Sharma is making a mockery of India's honour. He just wants to earn money and doesn't care about the country, we strongly condemn Sharma for performing during PSL", Sena said. The situation of India with its western neighbouring nation is bad from 2008 Mumbai terrorist attack, In it, 168 people died and 238 were severely injured in an unprecedented terrorist attack.

In 2018, Kapil Sharma abused journalist Vicky Lalwani of SpotboyE in a telephone conversation, later leaked by Lalwani, Sharma used foul language and asked the journalist reason for his negative articles about him. After the conversation went viral on social media, Sharma filed a police complaint against Vicky Lalwani, his ex-managers Preeti Simoes and Neeti Simoes for trying to extort INR 25 lakhs from him as well as alleged in a police complaint that, both sisters were used to take money from the people who use to arrive in Film City, Mumbai to see his show and  Preeti-Neeti manufactured miss understandings between him and his fellow comedians of his show and arriving guests. Simoes said all these allegations are false and made up stories. Preeti Simoes was a girlfriend of Kapil Sharma. She and her sister Neeti Simoes worked in Kapil Sharma's production or with him for eight years until 2017. But fault happened between Preeti and Kapil, after later announced his engagement with Ginny Charath in March 2017. Sharma also abused Spotboye and its editor Vicky Lalwani by doing a series of tweets, his employees tried to cover up by saying his account was hacked but later Sharma confessed that the abusive tweets were done by himself. Twitterati slammed Sharma for foul tweets and some expressed shock. On 8 April 2018, Spotboye filed a counter police report against Sharma for doing intimidation, abuse and threats.

Multiple times various people accused Kapil Sharma of doing derogatory, sexist comments about women. Once in 2014, he did a joke about a pregnant woman delivering a baby while travelling on his TV show, Comedy nights with Kapil. Women's rights activists filed a complaint against him. Many accused him of doing sexiest, vulgar and body shame remarks on women.

Activism
Sharma has been known for his efforts in promoting animal rights. He and the cast of Comedy Nights with Kapil appeared in a PETA campaign to promote the adoption of homeless cats and dogs. In July 2014, he adopted a homeless dog, a retired police dog from Mumbai. He has also campaigned to save tortured elephants across the country. 

Sharma was nominated in 2014 for the Swachh Bharat Abhiyan by the Indian Prime Minister Narendra Modi to spread awareness among people for cleanliness and other hygiene-related social issues. For his contribution towards the mission through his show, he was invited to the Rashtrapati Bhavan by President Pranab Mukherjee in September 2015 to acknowledge his contribution.

Singing Career

Kapil Sharma recently sang his first song Alone with Guru Randhawa with a video featuring Kapil Sharma and Yogita Bihani in the lead roles. The song was aired on Youtube on February 8, 2023.

Filmography

Films

Television

Music videos

Awards and nominations

See also 
 History of stand-up comedy 
 Comedy 
 Humour
 Humor styles - ways of humour  
 Humorist

References

External links

 
 

1981 births
Artists from Amritsar
Indian male comedians
Indian stand-up comedians
Indian television presenters
Living people
Punjabi people
21st-century Indian male artists